Map of places in North Lanarkshire compiled from this list

The List of places in North Lanarkshire is a list of links for any town, village, hamlet, castle golf course, historic house, hill fort, lighthouse, nature reserve, reservoir, river, and other place of interest in the North Lanarkshire council area of Scotland.

A
Abronhill
Airbles
Airbles railway station
Airdrie
Airdriehill
Airdrie Public Observatory
Airdrie railway station
Allanton
Annathill
Auchinloch
Auchinstarry

B
Balloch
Banton
Bargeddie
Bargeddie railway station
Barons Haugh RSPB Reserve
Bellshill
Bellshill railway station
Birkenshaw
Blackwood
Blairhill
Blairlinn
Bogside
Bonkle
Bothwellhaugh
Broadwood Stadium
Burnfoot

C
Cairnhill
Calderbank
Caldercruix
Caldercruix railway station
Cambusnethan
Carbrain
Cardowan
Carfin
Carfin railway station
Carnbroe
Carrickstone
Castle Cary Castle
Chapelhall
Chryston
Clarkston
Cleland
Cleland railway station
Cliftonhill
Cliftonville
Coatbridge
Coatbridge Central railway station
Coatbridge Sunnyside railway station
Coatdyke
Coatdyke railway station 
Coltness 
Colzium
Condorrat
Craigmarloch
Craigneuk (Airdrie)
Craigneuk (Wishaw)
Croy
Cumbernauld
Cumbernauld Airport
Cumbernauld House
Cumbernauld railway station
Cumbernauld town centre
Cumbernauld Village

D
Dalzell House
Dalziel Park
Dimsdale
Drumgelloch 
Drumgelloch railway station
Drumpellier
Drumpellier Country Park
Dullatur
Dumbreck Marsh
Dunbeth
Dundyvan
Dykehead

E
Eastfield (Cumbernauld)
Eastfield (Harthill)
Eurocentral
Excelsior Stadium

F
Fallside
Fir Park Stadium
Forgewood
Forrestfield

G
Gadloch
Garrion Bridge
Garnkirk
Gartcosh
Gartlea 
Gartsherrie
Glenboig
Glenmavis
Gowkthrapple
Greenacres 
Greendykeside
Greenend
Greenfaulds 
Greengairs
Greenhead 
Greenlink Cycle Path

H
Harthill
Hartwood
Hattonrigg 
Hillcrest
Hillend Loch Railway Path
Hillend Reservoir
Holehills
Holytown

J
Jerviston

K
Kildrum
Kilsyth
Kilsyth Castle
Kirkwood
Kirkwood railway station 
Kirkshaws

L
Langloan
Lenziemill
Longriggend
Luggiebank
Luggie Water

M
M&Ds
Millerston
Mollinsburn
Monkland Canal
Moodiesburn
Morningside
Mossend
Mossend EuroTerminal 
Motherwell
Motherwell railway station
Motherwell Shopping Centre
Mount Ellen 
Muirhead
Muirhouse

N
Netherton
Newarthill
Newhouse
Newmains
New Stevenston
North Calder Water
North Lanarkshire Heritage Centre
North Lodge 
North Motherwell

O
 Old Monkland
Orbiston 
Overtown

P
Palacerigg Country Park 
Pather
Perchy Pond
Petersburn
Plains

Q
Queenzieburn

R
Ravenscraig
Ravenscraig Regional Sports Facility
Ravenscraig steelworks
Ravenswood
Rawyards
Red Burn
Riggend
Rosehall

S
Salsburgh
Seafar 
Shawhead 
Shieldmuir railway station
Shotts
Sikeside
Smithstone
South Calder Water
Stand
Stane
Springhill
Stepps
Strathclyde Country Park
Summerlee, Museum of Scottish Industrial Life

T
Tannochside
Thrashbush
Torbothie
Torrance Park 
Townhead

U
Upperton
University Hospital Monklands
University Hospital Wishaw

V
Viewpark
 Viewpark Gardens

W
Wardpark
Waterloo
Wattston
Westfield
Westerwood
Whifflet
Whifflet railway station
Whinhall
Whitelees
Wishaw
Wishawhill
Wishaw railway station

See also
List of places in Scotland

North Lanarkshire
Geography of North Lanarkshire
Lists of places in Scotland
Populated places in Scotland